The Second Chengdu–Chongqing high-speed railway is a  long high-speed rail line that connects the cities of Chengdu (in Sichuan Province) and Chongqing in southwestern China, with a maximum speed of . It will head via Lezhi, Anyue, and Dazu. Construction started on September 26, 2021.

History
Approval for the 69.273 billion yuan project was granted on August 17, 2021 by the National Development and Reform Commission.

Construction started on September 26, 2021.

Stations

Other railways between Chengdu and Chongqing
The first railway between the two cities was the Chengdu–Chongqing railway, completed in the 1950s. The Suining–Chengdu railway and Suining–Chongqing railway form a route between the two cities which was completed in 2006. The fastest journeys on this line take just over two hours. The Chengdu–Chongqing intercity railway was completed in 2015.

References

High-speed railway lines in China
High-speed railway lines under construction
Rail transport in Chongqing
Rail transport in Sichuan